Acacia decora is a plant native to eastern Australia. Common names include the western silver wattle and the showy wattle. The species name refers to the plant's decorative qualities.

Description
It has angled reddish to brown branchlets that are appressed-hairy when young and becoming glabrescent with age. Like most species of Acacia it has phyllodes rather than true leaves. It has variable foliage and the phyllodes are generally thin with a narrowly elliptic to oblanceolate or obovate shape. It blooms between April and October producing bright yellow flowers.

Taxonomy
The species was first formally described in 1829 by the botanist Ludwig Reichenbach as part of the work Iconographia Botanica Exotica. It was reclassified as Racosperma decorum in 1987 by Leslie Pedley then transferred back to genus Acacia in 2014. There are many other synonyms for this species including Acacia decora var. decora, Acacia caleyi, Acacia podalyriifolia var. caleyi and Acacia buxifolia var. decora. The specific epithet is derived from the Latin word decorus in reference to the plants graceful appearance.

Distribution
The shrub is found down the east coast of Australia extending from north Queensland down to Victoria.
In New South Wales, showy wattle occurs west of the Great Dividing Range while in Queensland it extends to the coast, commonly seen in semi arid areas of the states of New South Wales and Victoria and throughout Queensland. It is sometimes seen in wetter areas in dry sclerophyll forest. Its range extends from around Cooktown in the north down to the Warby Range of Victoria in the south growing in stony sandy soils as a part of Eucalyptus woodland communities.

Cultivation
A. decora is a hardy species which can tolerate a wide range of conditions. It grows best in well drained soils and in a full sun to partly shady position. It can be grown from seed but must be pretreated by scarification or with boiling water.

See also
 List of Acacia species

References 

decora
Fabales of Australia
Shrubs
Entheogens
Flora of New South Wales
Flora of Queensland
Flora of Victoria (Australia)
Garden plants of Australia
Plants described in 1829
Taxa named by Ludwig Reichenbach